Ron Vandermeir Jr. (born August 18, 1982) is an American professional stock car racing driver. He currently competes part-time in the ARCA Menards Series and the ARCA Menards Series East, driving the No. 27/44/66 for Vanco Racing. He won the 2018, 2019, 2020, and 2021 Mid-American Stock Car Series championship in the Upper Midwestern United States.

Racing career 
Vandermeir made his ARCA Menards Series debut in the 2021 season at Elko Speedway where he started 8th and finished 11th. He then ran at Milwaukee and the season finale at Kansas, where he finished 14th and 15th respectively.

In 2022, Vandermeir made his first start of the year at the Dutch Boy 150, driving the No. 27, where he started 9th and finished 8th. He also drove the No. 44 at Iowa, Kansas II, and Bristol, and the No. 66 at Elko and Milwaukee, securing a top 10 at Iowa and Elko, respectively.

Motorsports career results

ARCA Menards Series 
(key) (Bold – Pole position awarded by qualifying time. Italics – Pole position earned by points standings or practice time. * – Most laps led. ** – All laps led.)

ARCA Menards Series East

References

External links
 
 

1982 births
Living people
ARCA Menards Series drivers
NASCAR drivers
Racing drivers from Illinois